Moravian Book Shop is a book store based in Bethlehem, Pennsylvania. It was founded in 1745 by the Moravian Church and lays claim to being the oldest continuously operating bookstore in the United States and the second oldest in the world. (The Livraria Bertrand in Lisbon, Portugal, which has been open since 1732, is the oldest bookstore in the world.) 

The Moravian Book Shop, as of June 2018, is also home to the Moravian College student bookstore. In 2018, the Moravian Church Northern Province approached Moravian College seeking to sell the store to entrust the legacy of the Book Shop to an owner within the "Moravian Family" and continue its focus on their 85 congregations. The bookstore is currently owned by Moravian College with day-to-day operations handled by Barnes & Noble College Booksellers.

History 
In 1745, Bishop Augustus Spangenberg of the Moravian Church charged Samuel Powell, an innkeeper on the South Side of Bethlehem, to open and operate a bookstore. In its early years, the store served to cater to the needs of the church, importing and selling devotional and liturgical materials for use by churchgoers, missionaries, and students. Over the next century, the store was moved to several locations, including, for a time, to Philadelphia, where it existed as both a seller and printer of books.

In 1871, the store was moved to a building near the Central Moravian Church on Main Street in Bethlehem. The store occupies the same space to this day, though it has expanded several times in the intervening 140 years and now fills  in four buildings. The bookstore is now owned by the Ministers' Pension Fund of the Northern Province of the Moravian Church and is overseen by a board of directors which is appointed by the church.

In 2015, the store opened its first satellite location in Center City Allentown as part of the Two City Center complex. The location was closed in May 2017 to refocus on the Bethlehem location and remaining stock was moved there.

In April 2018, nearby Moravian College announced the acquisition of the shop. The historic bookstore would become the central student bookstore for the college. Employee Leo Atkinson created a petition to the college to reconsider their decision.

Features
The Moravian Book Shop features a book section that includes indie best sellers, trade books, and select books highlighting the history of Moravians, Bethlehem, Bethlehem Steel, the Lehigh Valley and Pennsylvania. In addition, the Moravian Book Shop sells and buys back student textbooks. The Book Shop also stocks Moravian College apparel and gift items, reference books, stationery and art supplies, greeting cards, candy, and health and beauty aids. In addition, the inventory also includes traditional Moravian- and Bethlehem-themed gifts and College faculty- and alumni-authored books. The store also hosts weekly reading and discussion groups and monthly events with authors.

Moravian Stars
The store specializes in the sale of hundreds of Moravian Stars, also called Advent Stars, which were first produced in 19th-century Germany. The 26-point stars are produced in many styles and fabricated in various materials. These will continue to be produced with the change of ownership.

References

External links
Official website
Photos of Moravian Book Shop

Bookstores established in the 18th century
1745 establishments in Pennsylvania
Independent bookstores of the United States
Bethlehem, Pennsylvania
Moravian settlement in Pennsylvania
Moravian University
Barnes & Noble